The 2017–18 NJIT Highlanders women's basketball team represents New Jersey Institute of Technology during the 2017–18 NCAA Division I women's basketball season. The Highlanders, led by sixth year head coach Steve Lanpher, play their home games at the Wellness and Events Center. They were third year members of the Atlantic Sun Conference. They finished the season 4–26, 2–12 in A-Sun play to finish in last place. They lost in the quarterfinals of A-Sun Tournament to Florida Gulf Coast.

On March 8, head coach Steve Lanpher resigns. He finished at NJIT with a sixth year record of 55–124.

Roster

Schedule

|-
!colspan=9 style="background:#; color:#FFFFFF;"| Non-conference regular season

|-
!colspan=9 style="background:#; color:#FFFFFF;"| Atlantic Sun regular season

|-
!colspan=9 style="background:#; color:#FFFFFF;"| Atlantic Sun Women's Tournament

See also
2017–18 NJIT Highlanders men's basketball team

References

NJIT Highlanders
NJIT Highlanders women's basketball seasons
NJIT Highlanders Women's B
NJIT Highlanders Women's B